Rumis is a board game about optimal placement of blocks of various shapes within a confined space. Rumi means "stone" in  Quechua. The theme and artwork are inspired by the Inca architecture. Rumis has also been published under the name Blokus 3-D.

Rules

Equipment 
There are several playing boards available – each with a different architectural theme. The pieces are composed of two, three, and four cubes. Each player has eleven colored blocks, each block with a different shape (two of the four cube blocks are reflections of each other).

Setup 
Start with the board empty. Each player should have all of the blocks of their color available to them.

Object 
The goal of the game is to have the most blocks of your color visible from the top at the end of the game.

Play 
Play rotates among the players. The first piece may be placed anywhere. The other pieces played in the first round must be placed touching a piece of another color. On each following round, newly played pieces must touch a piece of their own color. Each playing board has a height restriction that limits how tall the structure may be, and pieces must rest wholly on the ground or other pieces, so that there can never be empty space underneath part of a piece.

If a player cannot legally place a piece, (which may happen because they have already placed all of their pieces), their turn is skipped. Play continues until no player can legally play any more pieces. Players are penalized one point for each piece of their color that they have not placed, and earn one point for each 1x1 portion of a piece which is visible when looking straight down from above the structure.

Strategy 
Being a game for younger players, the strategic element is not as deep as other block games such as Pueblo, however it still does have a strategic element of limiting other player's moves, ensuring that you have space to make more plays, and saving your own pieces with a large surface area for play at the top of the structure.

Variants 
 Rumis can be played by two players, with each player controlling two colors.
 Rumis can be played as a solitaire game creating a soma cube with some number of pieces.

References

External links 

 Rules for Rumis from publisher's website.
 Board Game Geek page

Board games introduced in 2003
Abstract strategy games
Mensa Select winners